"Everlasting Nothing" is a song by the American musician Beck. It was released on November 14, 2019 as the fourth single from his fourteenth studio album Hyperspace. Beck and Pharrell Williams wrote and produced "Everlasting Nothing", and played all the instruments on it. Beck sings, plays guitar and piano, while Williams plays drums and keyboard. It also features a choir.

Beck had already performed "Everlasting Nothing" twice in 2013, both at shows in California.

Critical reception
Claire Shaffer of Rolling Stone wrote that the song "combines Beck's guitar-laden folk-pop with some quirky Pharrell additions: sci-fi synthesizers, calming bongos and staccato drum machines give it a distinctively space-age vibe". Stereogum wrote that the song "could've easily been a pretty good Morning Phase-type song, but it keeps twisting and adding on more interesting musical choices, and it's all the better for it".

References

2019 singles
2019 songs
Beck songs
Songs written by Beck
Songs written by Pharrell Williams